In three dimensional geometry, there are four infinite series of point groups in three dimensions (n≥1) with n-fold rotational or reflectional symmetry about one axis (by an angle of 360°/n) that does not change the object.

They are the finite symmetry groups on a cone. For n = ∞ they correspond to four frieze groups. Schönflies notation is used. The terms horizontal (h) and vertical (v) imply the existence and direction of reflections with respect to a vertical axis of symmetry. Also shown are Coxeter notation in brackets, and, in parentheses, orbifold notation.

Types 

Chiral
Cn, [n]+, (nn) of order n - n-fold rotational symmetry - acro-n-gonal group (abstract group Zn); for n=1: no symmetry (trivial group)
AchiralCnh, [n+,2], (n*) of order 2n - prismatic symmetry or ortho-n-gonal group (abstract group Zn × Dih1); for n=1 this is denoted by Cs (1*) and called reflection symmetry, also bilateral symmetry. It has reflection symmetry with respect to a plane perpendicular to the n-fold rotation axis.Cnv, [n], (*nn) of order 2n - pyramidal symmetry or full acro-n-gonal group (abstract group Dihn); in biology  C2v is called biradial symmetry. For n=1 we have again Cs (1*). It has vertical mirror planes. This is the symmetry group for a regular n-sided pyramid.S2n, [2+,2n+], (n×) of order 2n - gyro-n-gonal group (not to be confused with symmetric groups, for which the same notation is used; abstract group Z2n); It has a 2n-fold rotoreflection axis, also called 2n-fold improper rotation axis, i.e., the symmetry group contains a combination of a reflection in the horizontal plane and a rotation by an angle 180°/n. Thus, like Dnd, it contains a number of improper rotations without containing the corresponding rotations.
 for n=1 we have S2 (1×), also denoted by Ci; this is inversion symmetry.

C2h, [2,2+] (2*) and C2v, [2], (*22) of order 4 are two of the three 3D symmetry group types with the Klein four-group as abstract group. C2v applies e.g. for a rectangular tile with its top side different from its bottom side.

Frieze groups 
In the limit these four groups represent Euclidean plane frieze groups as C∞, C∞h, C∞v, and S∞. Rotations become translations in the limit. Portions of the infinite plane can also be cut and connected into an infinite cylinder.

Examples

See also
 Dihedral symmetry in three dimensions

References 

 On Quaternions and Octonions, 2003, John Horton Conway and Derek A. Smith  
 The Symmetries of Things 2008, John H. Conway, Heidi Burgiel, Chaim Goodman-Strass, 
 Kaleidoscopes: Selected Writings of H.S.M. Coxeter, edited by F. Arthur Sherk, Peter McMullen, Anthony C. Thompson, Asia Ivic Weiss, Wiley-Interscience Publication, 1995,  
 N.W. Johnson: Geometries and Transformations, (2018)  Chapter 11: Finite symmetry groups, 11.5 Spherical Coxeter groups

Symmetry